Hallpike is a surname. Notable people with the surname include:

 Charles Skinner Hallpike (1900–1979), English otologist
 Christopher Robert Hallpike (born 1938), English-Canadian anthropologist